Gareth Dean (born 31 March 1981) is a Welsh former professional rugby league footballer who played in the 2000s. He played for the South Wales Scorpions in the Championship One and AS Carcassonne in the Elite One Championship. He has previously played for the Wigan Warriors, Crusaders, Cardiff Demons and London Broncos.

International honours
Gareth Dean won caps for Wales while at Wigan, unattached, Workington Town, AS Carcassonne, and the Celtic Crusaders 2001...2007 7(10, 12?)-caps + 4-caps (interchange/substitute).

References

External links
Celtic Crusaders sign Wales duo (BBC SPORT)

1981 births
Living people
AS Carcassonne players
Cardiff Demons players
Crusaders Rugby League players
Expatriate rugby league players in France
London Broncos players
Rugby league players from Rhondda Cynon Taf
Rugby league props
Wales national rugby league team players
Welsh expatriate rugby league players
Welsh expatriate sportspeople in France
Welsh rugby league players